Ryan Poles (born September 20, 1985) is an American football executive and former offensive lineman who is the general manager of the Chicago Bears of the National Football League (NFL). Poles previously served as the executive director of player personnel for the Kansas City Chiefs and had served in various executive roles with the Chiefs for 13 seasons.

Early years
A native of Canandaigua, New York, Poles attended Canandaigua Academy before playing college football at Boston College as an offensive lineman from 2003 to 2007. Poles signed as an undrafted free agent with the Chicago Bears in 2008, but he didn't make it on the 53-man roster and was cut.

Executive career

Boston College
In 2008, following the end of his playing career, Poles returned to his alma mater Boston College as a graduate assistant and was involved in recruiting.

Kansas City Chiefs
In 2009, Poles was hired by the Kansas City Chiefs as a scouting assistant under general manager Scott Pioli. In 2010, he was promoted to college scouting coordinator. In 2013, Poles was retained under new general manager John Dorsey.

In 2016, Poles was promoted to director of college scouting. Poles was retained and promoted to assistant director of player personnel in 2018 under new general manager Brett Veach.

On June 9, 2021, Poles was promoted to executive director of player personnel.

Chicago Bears
On January 25, 2022, Poles was named the general manager of the Chicago Bears, replacing Ryan Pace. Poles' first significant move with the Bears was trading linebacker Khalil Mack to the Los Angeles Chargers for a second round pick in the 2022 NFL Draft and a sixth round pick in 2023.

On March 10, 2023, Poles traded the No. 1 pick in the NFL Draft to the Carolina Panthers for the 9th overall pick, the 61st overall pick, a 2024 1st round pick, a 2024 2nd round pick, and WR DJ Moore.

Personal life
Poles is married to his wife, Katie, and they have two children together. Poles graduated from Boston College with a degree in communications in 2007.

References

External links
 Chicago Bears profile

1985 births
Living people
American football offensive linemen
Boston College Eagles football players
Chicago Bears executives
Chicago Bears players
Kansas City Chiefs executives
Kansas City Chiefs scouts
National Football League general managers
People from Canandaigua, New York
Players of American football from New York (state)
All Wikipedia articles written in American English
All stub articles